The 2019–20 Bosnia and Herzegovina Football Cup was the 24th edition of Bosnia and Herzegovina's annual football cup, and the nineteenth season of the unified competition.

Sarajevo were the defending champions, but they got eliminated by Široki Brijeg in the second round. The cup was abandoned on 1 June 2020 due to the COVID-19 pandemic in Bosnia and Herzegovina and was not finished.

Participating teams
The following teams took part in the 2019–20 Bosnia and Herzegovina Football Cup.

Roman number in brackets denote the level of respective league in Bosnian football league system

Calendar

Bracket

First round
Played on 18 September 2019

Second round
Played on 2 October 2019

Quarter-finals
Played on 4 March 2020

Semi-finals
Cancelled due to the COVID-19 pandemic in Bosnia and Herzegovina.

Final
Cancelled due to the COVID-19 pandemic in Bosnia and Herzegovina.

References

External links
Football Federation of Bosnia and Herzegovina
SportSport.ba

2019-20
2019–20 in Bosnia and Herzegovina football
2019–20 European domestic association football cups
Association football events curtailed and voided due to the COVID-19 pandemic